, or World Witches Series: 502nd Joint Fighter Wing Brave Witches, is an anime television series produced by Silver Link, which is a spin-off of the Strike Witches multimedia franchise created by Humikane Shimada. Taking place between the first and second seasons of Strike Witches, the series centers on the Fuso witch Hikari Karibuchi as she joins the titular squadron to fight the Neuroi forces when her sister Takami is seriously injured in battle. The series was directed by Kazuhiro Takamura and written by the Striker Unit scriptwriting team with Seikou Nagaoka serving as the music composer.

The series ran on Tokyo MX in Japan from October 6 to December 29, 2016 with later airings on 8 other stations; it was simulcast worldwide by Crunchyroll. In April 2017, Funimation announced that the English dubbed version would be streamed on their FunimationNow streaming service beginning on May 8. In Japan, the series was released on DVD and Blu-ray Disc in six compilations, each containing two episodes, from February 24 to July 28, 2017. An original video animation episode was released in select theaters on May 13, 2017 and included with a special edition volume released on August 25, 2017.

Two pieces of theme music are used: an opening theme and an ending theme. The opening theme is  performed by Yoko Ishida and the ending theme is "Little Wing ~Spirit of Lindberg~" performed by the series' voice actresses as their characters.

Episode list

Home releases

Japanese

DVD

Blu-ray

Notes

References

See also
List of Strike Witches episodes
List of Strike Witches characters

Brave Witches
World War II alternate histories

ja:ストライクウィッチーズ#ブレイブウィッチーズ